1Punch (Hangul: 원펀치) was a South Korean duo formed by Brave Entertainment in Seoul, South Korea, consisting of One and Punch (now known as Samuel). They debuted on January 23, 2015, with their single "Turn Me Back" (돌려놔) from the single album The Anthem. The duo ultimately disbanded after One signed with YG Entertainment. Both members debuted as solo artists in 2017.

Discography

Single albums

References

Brave Entertainment artists
Musical groups from Seoul
Musical groups established in 2015
2015 establishments in South Korea
2015 disestablishments in South Korea
South Korean musical duos